"We gaan naar Rome" (English: We're going to Rome) is a Schlager song by Simon Tahamata an association football player, who played for AFC Ajax and the Netherlands national team at the time of release which was in 1979 on Dutch label GIP. The song is the A-side to the record "We gaan naar Rome / Hallo mensen, hier is Rome" which was released as a 7"-single. The song was released prospectively in regard to the UEFA Euro 1980, following the Netherlands qualification to the finals amongst the last 8 of the tournament. Ajax star Simon Tahamata recorded this record implying the Dutch would reach the final hosted at the Stadio Olimpico in Rome. The Netherlands lost their first two matches to Greece and West Germany while beating Czechoslovakia in their last match, finishing third in their group and thus failing to advance past the group stage.

Having played an important role in the qualification process, he would however miss the final tournament in Italy due to an injury, playing a key role in the success of the Dutch in the Eighties nonetheless.

References
Footnotes

External links
 Simon Tahamata's "We gaan naar Rome / Hallo mensen, hier is Rome""release on Discogs
 Simon Tahamata's "We gaan naar Rome"" song lyrics on Songteksten.nl

AFC Ajax songs
1979 singles
Dutch pop songs
Dutch-language songs
Songs about Rome
Football songs and chants
1979 songs
Song articles with missing songwriters